This is an episode list for the science-fiction television series Star Trek: Voyager, which aired on UPN from January 1995 through May 2001. This is the fifth television program in the Star Trek franchise, and comprises a total of 168 (DVD and original broadcast) or 172 (syndicated) episodes over the show's seven seasons. Four episodes of Voyager ("Caretaker", "Dark Frontier", "Flesh and Blood", and "Endgame") each originally aired as two-hour presentations, and are considered whole episodes on the DVD release; additionally, parts I and II of "The Killing Game" aired back-to-back, and are treated as separate episodes on the DVD release. The episodes are listed in chronological order by original air date, which match the episode order in each season's DVD set. This list also includes the stardate on which the events of each episode took place.
Of the ratings listed below, total viewership for the episode is listed for season 1, however from season 2 the episode household ratings are listed.

Series overview

Episodes

Season 1 (1995)
{{Episode table |background=#73458A |overall=5 |season=5 |title=12 |aux1=6 |director=10 |writer=27 |airdate=11 |prodcode=7 |viewers=9 |country=U.S. |aux1T= |aux2T=Featuredcharacter(s) |episodes=

{{Episode list
 | EpisodeNumber      = 10
 | EpisodeNumber2     = 10
 | Title              = Prime Factors
 | Aux1               = 48642.5
 | DirectedBy         = Les Landau
 | WrittenBy          = 
 | OriginalAirDate    = 
 | ProdCode           = 40840-110
 | Viewers            = 10.7
 | ShortSummary       = A species that could shorten Voyager'''s journey with a transportation device will not share its technology.
 | LineColor          = 73458A
}}

}}

Season 2 (1995–96)
The last four episodes of season 1 were moved to season 2 (the episodes with stardates 48xxx).  "The 37's" was originally filmed as season 1's finale.

{{Episode table |background=#9F2929 |overall=5 |season=5 |title=12 |aux1=6 |director=10 |writer=27 |airdate=11 |prodcode=7 |viewers=9 |country=U.S. |aux1T= |aux2T=Featuredcharacter(s) |episodes=

{{Episode list
 | EpisodeNumber      = 30
 | EpisodeNumber2     = 14
 | Title              = Alliances
 | Aux1               = 49337.4
 | DirectedBy         = Les Landau
 | WrittenBy          = Jeri Taylor
 | OriginalAirDate    = 
 | ProdCode           = 40840-131
 | Viewers            = 7.9
 | ShortSummary       = Janeway attempts to form an alliance with the Kazon to improve Voyager's standing in the Delta Quadrant.
 | LineColor          = 9F2929
}}

}}

Season 3 (1996–97)
Four episodes from season 2 were moved to season 3 (specifically "Basics, Part II", "Flashback", "False Profits" and "Sacred Ground").

Season 4 (1997–98)

Season 5 (1998–99)

Season 6 (1999–2000)

Season 7 (2000–01)

Summary of 2-Part episodes
Here is a summary of 2-part Voyager episodes, which are sometimes shown as a single feature length media and reviewed as such.
	
"Caretaker" 
"Basics" 
"Future's End"
"Scorpion"
"Year of Hell"
"The Killing Game"
"Dark Frontier"
"Equinox"
"Unimatrix Zero"
"Flesh and Blood"
"Workforce"
"Endgame"

The feature-length episodes are among the series' highest rated. In a 2016 review by The Hollywood Reporter ranking the top 15 Voyager episodes, 6 were double-episodes with "Year of Hell" and "Equinox" in the top two spots. A 2012 top ten ranking by Den of Geek'' also placed "Year of Hell" as number one out of 172 shows.

See also

 Lists of Star Trek episodes

References

External links
 Memory Alpha
 Episode list  at startrek.com
 Season 1 , 2 , 3 , 4 , 5 , 6 , 7 
 Brief summaries and production and transmission details
 
 List of episodes with links to synopses, reviews and images for each episode

 
Voyager
Star Trek: Star Trek: Voyagers, List of

ca:Star Trek: Voyager#Capítols